Mohammad Ghassan Al-Basha (born February 5, 1988) is a Jordanian footballer who plays as a defender for Al-Jazeera and the Jordan national football team.

International career
He was one of the participants of the 2007 U-20 World Cup that was offered to play on the national team for seniors.

His first international game with the Jordan national team was between Jordan and Iraq in a friendly on September 16, 2010 in Amman, and Jordan won that match 4-1.

Honors and participation in international tournaments

In WAFF Championships 
2010 WAFF Championship

References

External links

Profile at kooora.com

1988 births
Association football midfielders
Jordanian footballers
Jordan international footballers
Living people
Jordanian Pro League players
Al-Taawoun FC players
Al-Jazeera (Jordan) players
Al-Wehdat SC players
Al-Ramtha SC players
Shabab Al-Ordon Club players
Jordanian expatriate sportspeople in Saudi Arabia
Expatriate footballers in Saudi Arabia
Jordanian expatriate footballers
Saudi Professional League players
2019 AFC Asian Cup players